The 2018 Asian Youth Olympic Games Qualifier for boys' field hockey was held from 25 to 28 April 2018 in Bangkok, Thailand. Only the winner and runner-up are qualifying for the finals.

Qualified teams

Format
The eleven teams will be split into two groups of five and six teams. The top two teams advance to the semifinals to determine the winner in a knockout system. The third and fourth placed teams will play for the 5-8th place classification. The bottom three teams play for the 9-11th place classification.

Results
All times are local (UTC+07:00).

First round

Pool A

Pool B

Second round

Ninth to eleventh place classification

Crossover

Ninth and tenth place

Fifth to eighth place classification

Crossover

Seventh and eighth place

Fifth and sixth place

First to fourth place classification

Semifinals

Third and fourth place

Final

Final standings

References

2018
Sports competitions in Bangkok
2018 sports events in Bangkok
April 2018 sports events in Asia
Field hockey at the 2018 Summer Youth Olympics